The Line is a 2017 Slovak-Ukrainian crime film directed by Peter Bebjak.

Plot
On the Slovakia–Ukraine border, shortly before Slovakia joins the Schengen Area, criminal smugglers sneak contraband into the European Union.

Cast
 Tomáš Maštalír as Adam Krajňák
 Stanislav Boklan as Krull
 Zuzana Fialová as Saša Krajňáková
 Benkö Géza as Taras
 Andrej Hryc as Peter Bernard
 Filip Kankovský as Viktor
 Emília Vášáryová as Anna Krajňáková

Awards and nominations
On 3 July 2017, The Line was released in Slovakia, as well as at the 52nd Karlovy Vary International Film Festival, where it was nominated for the Crystal Globe and won the Best Director Award for Bebjak. The film was also selected as the Slovak entry for the Best Foreign Language Film at the 90th Academy Awards, but it was not nominated.

See also
 List of submissions to the 90th Academy Awards for Best Foreign Language Film
 List of Slovak submissions for the Academy Award for Best Foreign Language Film

References

External links
 

2017 films
2017 crime films
2017 multilingual films
Slovak-language films
Films set in Slovakia
Films set in Ukraine
Films set in 2007
Sun in a Net Awards winners (films)
Golden Kingfisher winners
Slovak crime films
Ukrainian crime films